Santiago de Cuba, also known as Santiago General Senén Casas, is the main railway station of the city of Santiago de Cuba, seat of the homonym province, Cuba. It is owned by the state company Ferrocarriles de Cuba (FFCC) and is located in the central Paseo de Martí, nearby the city harbor.

It is the second most important stations of Cuba and, along with Havana Central, Camagüey and Santa Clara, is a network's divisional headquarter.

History

The station, named after the Cuban politician Senén Casas Regueiro, was completely renewed and rebuilt in 1997. The old station, located nearby harbor's custom office, is the terminal of harbor's rail siding.

Structure
Santiago station is a terminus composed by a large and modern building, covered with 2 vaults and counting a modern clock tower in the adjacent garden. In south, parallel to station tracks, is located a large shed and siding serving the harbor. A secondary shed is located in the Avenida Los Pions.

The station lies in Los Pinos ward (reparto) and the line, counting a double track, is not electrified. The double track route Santiago-San Luis is used also for trains linking Santiago to Bayamo and Guantánamo. A junction, departing from the nearby village of El Cristo and arriving to La Maya (on the line to Guantánamo), was only partially built.

Services
The station is the main eastern rail terminus, like the Havana Central is the main western one. It is served by several long-distance trains linking almost the whole island, including the flagship Tren Francés (French Train) Havana-Santa Clara-Camagüey-Santiago. Other long-distance trains, principally departing/ending at Havana Central, link Santiago to Matanzas, Ciego de Ávila, Las Tunas and other cities. There are also some inter-regional and regional trains to Palma Soriano, Bayamo, Manzanillo, Guantánamo and Holguín.

Gallery

See also

Camagüey railway station
Havana Central railway station
Santa Clara railway station

References

External links

Railway Station
Railway stations in Cuba

Railway stations in Cuba opened in 1997